The Dominion Network was the second English-language radio network of the Canadian Broadcasting Corporation from January 1, 1944 to 1962.

It consisted of the CBC-owned CJBC radio station in Toronto and a series of 34 privately owned affiliates from coast-to-coast. The Dominion Network was set up as a complementary network to the CBC's main English service which became known as the Trans-Canada Network. While the Trans-Canada Network focus was on public affairs, educational and cultural programs, the Dominion Network's broadcast schedule consisted of lighter programming fare than that of the Trans-Canada Network and carried more American programming.

As well, the Dominion Network operated mostly in the evenings, freeing affiliates to air local programming during the day.

History
The Dominion Network was launched on January 1, 1944 after a request by private affiliates asking to set up their own radio network in order to carry American programming was turned down. CBC became concerned that the private stations might succeed in pressuring the government to permit such a private radio network. As a result, the CBC set up its own second network to appease demands by privately owned CBC affiliates for popular programming that would provide more commercial revenue.

The network was managed by Spence Caldwell, who later became a founder of CTV. Shows carried by the network included Duffy's Tavern, Amos & Andy and Fibber McGee and Molly.

There is an urban legend that a CBC announcer once accidentally gave a station identification as "the Dominion Network of the Canadian Broadcorping Castration", which was popularized when U.S. TV producer Kermit Schaefer included a recreation of this incident on one of his best-selling Pardon My Blooper record albums in the 1950s. Canadian political pundit Mark Steyn often refers to the CBC as such in his columns.

The network was dissolved in 1962 and most of the private stations became independent. CJBC gradually became a French-language station and is now the Southern Ontario owned-and-operated station of Radio-Canada's Première Chaîne.

Stations

Alberta
 Calgary - CFCN
 Edmonton - CFRN (affiliated with CBC Radio for two years after the Trans-Canada and Dominion Networks merged)
 Medicine Hat - CHAT (affiliated with CBC Radio when the Trans-Canada and Dominion Networks merged)

British Columbia
 Chilliwack - CHWK  (affiliated with CBC Radio when the Trans-Canada and Dominion Networks merged)
 Penticton - CKOK (affiliated with CBC Radio when the Trans-Canada and Dominion Networks merged)
 Vancouver - CJOR
 Vernon - CJIB
 Victoria - CJVI (affiliated with CBC Radio when the Trans-Canada and Dominion Networks merged)

Manitoba
 Brandon - CKX  (affiliated with CBC Radio when the Trans-Canada and Dominion Networks merged)
 Winnipeg - CKRC

New Brunswick
Saint John - CFBC

Nova Scotia
Halifax - CHNS
Sydney - CJCB (from 1948, previously a TCN affiliate)

Ontario
Brantford - CKPC
Fort Frances - CKFI  (affiliated with CBC Radio when the Trans-Canada and Dominion Networks merged)
Hamilton - CHML
Kingston - CKLC/CKLC-FM (shared affiliation 1953-1962)
Kitchener - CKCR (1949-1960) (CKCR-AM-FM affiliated with CBC Radio when the Trans-Canada and Dominion Networks merged.)
London - CFPL  (affiliated with CBC Radio when the Trans-Canada and Dominion Networks merged)
Orillia - CFOR (from 1945)  (affiliated with CBC Radio when the Trans-Canada and Dominion Networks merged)
Ottawa - CKCO (became CKOY in 1949)
Owen Sound - CFOS (affiliated with CBC Radio when the Trans-Canada and Dominion Networks merged)
Peterborough - CHEX
St. Catharines - CKTB
Stratford - CJCS
Sudbury - CHNO
Thunder Bay - CFPA  (affiliated with CBC Radio when the Trans-Canada and Dominion Networks merged)
Toronto - CJBC (flagship, the only CBC owned and operated station, converted to French-language Radio-Canada station in 1964) 
Windsor - CKLW (affiliated with both Trans-Canada and Dominion until 1950 when CBC owned CBE launched)
Wingham - CKNX

Prince Edward Island
Charlottetown - CFCY (affiliated with CBC Radio when the Trans-Canada and Dominion Networks merged)

Quebec
Montreal - CFCF now defunct 
Quebec City - CJQC (affiliated in 1949; previously CKCV was affiliated with both the Trans-Canada Network and the Dominion Network. CJQC affiliated with CBC Radio when the Trans-Canada and Dominion Networks merged) now defunct

Saskatchewan
Moose Jaw - CHAB
Prince Albert - CKBI
Regina - CKRM
Saskatoon - CFQC

References 
History of Canadian Broadcasting: CBC Radio Networks

CBC Radio
Defunct Canadian radio networks
1944 establishments in Canada
1962 disestablishments in Canada